Guarujá is a municipality in the São Paulo state of Brazil. It is part of the Metropolitan Region of Baixada Santista. This place name comes from the Tupi language, and means "narrow path". The population is highly urbanized.

Geography

Guarujá is located in Santo Amaro island, situated in São Paulo shore. Its main economic sources are seasonal tourism and port related activities.

Guarujá is a popular weekend destination for families from São Paulo, who can get there driving in less than one hour (through the Imigrantes highway). Traffic gets heavy during the evening on the holidays.

Guarujá has a borough called Vicente de Carvalho, in tribute to the Parnasianist poet.

A nickname for the city is "The Pearl of the Atlantic".

In total, Guarujá has 27 beaches, the most famous are Guaiúba, Tombo, Astúrias, Pitangueiras, Enseada, Pernambuco, Perequê, São Pedro, Tijucopava, Iporanga, Praia Branca and Praia Preta.

Economy
Guaruja, its history, infrastructure and proximity to the country's most populous city, provides strong attractive real estate and tourism. Much of the region on the coast, the beaches near the center (mainly Asturias Pitangueiras, Enseada, and Tombo) are taken by buildings devoted to the seasonal population, who arrives mostly in summer. Tourism, therefore, is the most important component that moves the economy.

The other part, relevant and non-seasonal, comes from the port (left bank of the Port of Santos) and related activities, such as transportation. Due to its proximity to Cubatao (largest industrial district in the country) and ports, there is also interest in industrial occupation in the region, started in 1976 by Dow Chemical, still the only major industry to occupy the region.

According to the IBGE of 2006 the production of wealth in the service area in the city, added that year, US$1.820 billion, equivalent to 0.14% in participation in the Brazilian GDP.

Twin towns – sister cities
Guarujá is twinned with:
  Cascais, Lisbon District, Portugal (2000)
  Brotas, São Paulo, Brazil (2001)
  Lobito, Benguela Province, Angola (2013)

Tourist attractions
 Andradas Fort
 Acqua Mundo
 Teatro Municipal Procópio Ferreira

Sports
The Estádio Municipal Antônio Fernandes is a football (soccer) stadium located in the city. Associação Desportiva Guarujá play their home games at this stadium. The Bosnia and Herzegovina national football team picked Guarujá as their base during the 2014 FIFA World Cup in Brazil.

Charles Oliveira, the former UFC lightweight champion, was born and raised in Guarujá. He proudly represents Guarujá and is known for his charitable contributions to the community, especially during the COVID-19 pandemic.

Airport and Air Force Base
Santos Air Force Base – BAST, a base of the Brazilian Air Force, is located in Guarujá.

The city will be served by Guarujá Civil Metropolitan Aerodrome, located in the vicinity of the Air Force Base.

Notable people
 Maria Antonieta de Brito was mayor of Gurauja.
 Alexandre Tam (Real Name: Alexandre Gomes Felipe), Brazilian professional soccer player (Santos FC)
 Charles Oliveira, Brazilian mixed martial artist and former UFC Lightweight Champion
 Cláudia das Neves (Real Name: Cláudia Maria das Neves), Brazilian women's basketball player
 Diego Gonçalves, Brazilian professional soccer player (Figueirense FC/Louletano D.C.)
 Jean Paulo Fernandes, Brazilian retired professional soccer player 
 KondZilla (Real Name: Konrad Dantas), Brazilian screenwriter, director, producer and YouTuber
 Maria José Dupré, Brazilian writer and novelist (Eramos Seis)
 Mazinho Oliveira (Real Name: Waldemar Aureliano de Oliveira Filho), Brazilian retired professional soccer player

References

External links 

 City Hall page
 Hotels in Guarujá – Find hotels, restaurants, bars and useful links about Guarujá / SP
 Encontra Guarujá – Find everything about Guarujá city

Populated places established in 1934
Atlantic islands of Brazil
Populated coastal places in São Paulo (state)
Municipalities in São Paulo (state)
Baixada Santista
1934 establishments in Brazil